Belvidere High School may refer to:

 Belvidere High School (Illinois), Belvidere, Illinois
 Belvidere High School (New Jersey), Belvidere, New Jersey

See also 
 Belvidere School, Shrewsbury, Shropshire, England–